Rajni Rawat is the only transgender politician in Uttarakhand, served as the Vice president of Women Empowerment & Child Development (Women Commission, Uttarakhand).

Elections contested

Uttarakhand Legislative Assembly

Dehradun Municipal Corporation

References

External links
 2017 Election Affidavit (Raipur Assembly)
 2017 Election Affidavit (Dharampur Assembly)

Living people
People from Dehradun district
Transgender women
Transgender politicians
Year of birth missing (living people)